Columbia Township is the name of five townships in the U.S. state of Indiana:

 Columbia Township, Dubois County, Indiana
 Columbia Township, Fayette County, Indiana
 Columbia Township, Gibson County, Indiana
 Columbia Township, Jennings County, Indiana
 Columbia Township, Whitley County, Indiana

See also
 Columbia Township (disambiguation)

Indiana township disambiguation pages